French literature generally speaking, is literature written in the French language, particularly by citizens of France; it may also refer to literature written by people living in France who speak traditional languages of France other than French. Literature written in the French language, by citizens of other nations such as Belgium, Switzerland, Canada, Senegal, Tunisia, Algeria, Morocco, etc. is referred to as Francophone literature. France itself ranks first on the list of Nobel Prizes in literature by country.

For centuries, French literature has been an object of national pride for French people, and it has been one of the most influential components of the literature of Europe.

One of the first known examples of French literature is the Song of Roland, the first major work in a series of poems known as, "chansons de geste".

The French language is a Romance language derived from Latin and heavily influenced principally by Celtic and Frankish. Beginning in the 11th century, literature written in medieval French was one of the oldest vernacular (non-Latin) literatures in western Europe and it became a key source of literary themes in the Middle Ages across the continent.

Although the European prominence of French literature was eclipsed in part by vernacular literature in Italy in the 14th century, literature in France in the 16th century underwent a major creative evolution, and through the political and artistic programs of the Ancien Régime, French literature came to dominate European letters in the 17th century.

In the 18th century, French became the literary lingua franca and diplomatic language of western Europe (and, to a certain degree, in America), and French letters have had a profound impact on all European and American literary traditions while at the same time being heavily influenced by these other national traditions. Africa and the far East have brought the French language to non-European cultures that are transforming and adding to the French literary experience today.

Under the aristocratic ideals of the Ancien Régime (the "honnête homme"), the nationalist spirit of post-revolutionary France, and the mass educational ideals of the Third Republic and modern France, the French have come to have a profound cultural attachment to their literary heritage. Today, French schools emphasize the study of novels, theater and poetry (often learnt by heart). The literary arts are heavily sponsored by the state and literary prizes are major news. The Académie française and the Institut de France are important linguistic and artistic institutions in France, and French television features shows on writers and poets (one of the most watched shows on French television was Apostrophes, a weekly talk show on literature and the arts). Literature matters deeply to the people of France and plays an important role in their sense of identity.

As of 2022, fifteen French authors have been awarded the Nobel Prize in Literature which is more than novelists, poets and essayists of any other country. In 1964 Jean-Paul Sartre was awarded the Nobel Prize in Literature, but he declined it, stating that "It is not the same thing if I sign Jean-Paul Sartre or if I sign Jean-Paul Sartre, Nobel Prize winner. A writer must refuse to allow himself to be transformed into an institution, even if it takes place in the most honorable form."

French Nobel Prize in Literature winners

For most of the 20th century, French authors had more Literature Nobel Prizes than those of any other nation. The following French or French language authors have won a Nobel Prize in Literature:
1901 – Sully Prudhomme (The first Nobel Prize in Literature)
1904 – Frédéric Mistral (wrote in Occitan)
1915 – Romain Rolland
1921 – Anatole France
1927 – Henri Bergson
1937 – Roger Martin du Gard
1947 – André Gide
1952 – François Mauriac
1957 – Albert Camus
1960 – Saint-John Perse
1964 – Jean-Paul Sartre (declined the prize)
1969 – Samuel Beckett (Irish, wrote in English and French)
1985 – Claude Simon
2008 – J. M. G. Le Clézio
2014 – Patrick Modiano
2022 - Annie Ernaux

French literary awards
 Grand Prix de Littérature Policière – created in 1948, for crime and detective fiction.
 Grand Prix du roman de l'Académie française – created 1918.
 Prix Décembre – created in 1989.
 Prix Femina – created 1904, decided each year by an exclusively female jury, although the authors of the winning works do not have to be women.
 Prix Goncourt – created 1903, given to the author of "the best and most imaginative prose work of the year".
 Prix Goncourt des Lycéens – created in 1987.
 Prix Littéraire Valery Larbaud – created in 1957.
 Prix Médicis – created 1958, awarded to an author whose "fame does not yet match their talent."
 Prix Renaudot – created in 1926.
 Prix Tour-Apollo Award – 1972–1990, given to the best science fiction novel published in French during the preceding year.
 Prix des Deux Magots – created in 1933.

Key texts

Fiction
Middle Ages
 anonymous – La Chanson de Roland (The Song of Roland)
 Chrétien de Troyes – Yvain ou le Chevalier au Lion (Yvain, the Knight of the Lion), Lancelot, ou le Chevalier à la charrette (Lancelot, the Knight of the Cart)
 various – Tristan et Iseult (Tristan and Iseult)
 anonymous – Lancelot-Graal (Lancelot-Grail), also known as the prose Lancelot or the Vulgate Cycle
 Guillaume de Lorris and Jean de Meung – Roman de la Rose ("Romance of the Rose")
 Christine de Pizan – "The Book of the City of Ladies"
 16th century
 François Rabelais – La vie de Gargantua et de Pantagruel ("Gargantua and Pantagruel")
 17th century
 Honoré d'Urfé – L'Astrée
 Madame de Lafayette – La Princesse de Clèves
 18th century
 Abbé Prévost – Manon Lescaut
 Voltaire – Candide, Zadig ou la Destinée
 Jean-Jacques Rousseau – Julie, ou la nouvelle Héloïse
 Denis Diderot – Jacques le fataliste (Jacques the Fatalist)
 Montesquieu – Persian Letters
 Pierre Choderlos de Laclos – Les Liaisons dangereuses
 Marquis de Sade – Justine (Sade)
 19th century
 François-René de Chateaubriand – Atala, René
 Benjamin Constant – Adolphe
 Stendhal – Le Rouge et le Noir (The Red and the Black), La Chartreuse de Parme (The Charterhouse of Parma)
 Honoré de Balzac – La Comédie humaine ("The Human Comedy", a novel cycle which includes Père Goriot, Lost Illusions, and Eugénie Grandet)
 Alexandre Dumas – The Count of Monte Cristo, The Three Musketeers
 Victor Hugo – Notre Dame de Paris (The Hunchback of Notre Dame), Les Misérables
 Théophile Gautier – Mademoiselle de Maupin
 Gustave Flaubert – Madame Bovary, Salammbô, L'Éducation sentimentale (Sentimental Education)
 Jules Verne – Vingt mille lieues sous les mers (Twenty Thousand Leagues Under the Sea), Voyage au centre de la Terre (A Journey to the Center of the Earth), Le tour du monde en quatre-vingts jours (Around the World in Eighty Days)
 Edmond and Jules de Goncourt – Germinie Lacerteux
 George Sand – La Petite Fadette
 Guy de Maupassant – Bel Ami, La Parure (The Necklace), other short stories
 Émile Zola – Thérèse Raquin, Les Rougon-Macquart (a novel cycle which includes L'Assommoir, Nana and Germinal)
 20th century
 André Gide – Les Faux-monnayeurs (The Counterfeiters), L'Immoraliste (The Immoralist)
 Marcel Proust – À la recherche du temps perdu (In Search of Lost Time)
 Albert Cohen
 François Mauriac
 Louis Aragon
 Blaise Cendrars
 André Breton – Nadja
 Gaston Leroux – Le Fantôme de l'Opéra (The Phantom of the Opera)
 Roger Martin du Gard – Les Thibault (The Thibaults)
 Louis-Ferdinand Céline – Voyage au bout de la nuit (Journey to the End of the Night)
 Colette – Gigi
 Jean Genet – Notre-Dame-des-Fleurs
 Julien Gracq – Le Rivage des Syrtes (The Opposing Shore)
 André Malraux – La Condition Humaine (Man's Fate), L'Espoir (Man's Hope)
 Albert Camus – L'Étranger (The Stranger or The Outsider)
 Michel Butor – La Modification
 Marguerite Yourcenar – Mémoires d'Hadrien
 Alain Robbe-Grillet – Dans le labyrinthe
 Georges Perec – La vie mode d'emploi
 Claude Simon - Les Géorgiques (The Georgics)
 Robert Pinget – Passacaille
 Jean-Paul Sartre – La Nausée (Nausea), L´Âge de Raison (The Age of Reason)
 Françoise Sagan – Bonjour Tristesse (Hello Sadness)
 Antoine de Saint-Exupéry – Le Petit Prince (The Little Prince)
 21st century
 Michel Houellebecq – La carte et le territoire (The Map and the Territory)
 Léonora Miano – La Saison de l'ombre
 Kamel Daoud – Meursault, contre-enquête (The Meursault Investigation)

Poetry
 Middle Ages
 William IX (1071–1127)
 Jaufre Rudel (1113–70)
 Bernart de Ventadorn (1130–90)
 Bertran de Born (1140–1215)
 Rutebeuf (1245–85)
 Jean Froissart (1337–1405)
 François Villon (1431–63) – Le Testament
 La Pléiade
 Clément Marot (1496–1544)
 Joachim du Bellay (1522–60)
 Pontus de Tyard (1521–1605)
 Pierre de Ronsard (1524–85)
 Baroque
 Agrippa d'Aubigné (1552–1630) – Les Tragiques
 Théophile de Viau (1590–1626)
 Classicism
 François de Malherbe (1555–1628)
 Jean de La Fontaine (1621–95) – The Fables
 Nicolas Boileau (1636–1711)
 Romantism
 André Chénier (1762–1794)
 Alphonse de Lamartine (1790–1869) – Méditations poétiques
 Alfred de Vigny (1797–1863)
 Victor Hugo (1802–85) – Les Contemplations
 Gérard de Nerval (1808–55) – The Chimeras
 Alfred de Musset (1810–57)
 Charles Baudelaire (1821–67) – Les Fleurs du mal
 Parnassianism
 Théophile Gautier (1811–72)
 Leconte de Lisle (1818–94)
 Théodore de Banville (1823–91)
 Symbolism and Decadence
 Villiers de L'Isle-Adam (1838–89)
 Stéphane Mallarmé (1842–98)
 Paul Verlaine (1844–96)
 Comte de Lautréamont (1846–70)
 Arthur Rimbaud (1854–91) – Une Saison en Enfer
 Paul Valéry (1871–1945)
 Paul Fort (1872–1960)
 Modernism
Charles Péguy (1873–1914)
 Guillaume Apollinaire (1880–1918) – Alcools
 Blaise Cendrars (1887–1961)
 Saint-John Perse (1887–1975) – Vents
 Dada and Surrealism
 Paul Éluard (1895-1952)
 Tristan Tzara (1896–1963)
 André Breton (1896–1966)
 Louis Aragon (1897–1982)
 Henri Michaux (1899–1984)
 Robert Desnos (1900–45)
 René Char (1907–88)
 Postmodernism
 Jules Supervielle (1884–1960)
 Jean Cocteau (1889–1963)
 Francis Ponge (1899–1988) – Le Parti Pris des Choses
 Jacques Prévert (1900–77)
 Raymond Queneau (1903–76)
 Négritude
 Léopold Sédar Senghor (1906–2001)
 Birago Diop (1906–89)
 Aimé Césaire (1913–2008)

Theatre
 Pierre Corneille (1606–84)- Le Cid (1636), Horace
 Molière – Tartuffe, Le Misanthrope, Dom Juan, L'Avare (The Miser), Le Bourgeois Gentilhomme, L'École des femmes (The School for Wives), Le Malade imaginaire (The Imaginary Invalid)
 Jean Racine – Phèdre, Andromaque, Bérénice, Athalie
 Marivaux – Jeu de l'amour et du hasard
 Beaumarchais – Le Barbier de Séville (The Barber of Seville), La Folle journée, ou Le Mariage de Figaro (The Marriage of Figaro)
 Alfred Jarry – King Ubu
 Edmond Rostand – Cyrano de Bergerac
 Jean Giraudoux – The Trojan War Will Not Take Place
 Jean Anouilh – Becket, Antigone
 Jean-Paul Sartre – No Exit
 Eugène Ionesco – La Cantatrice chauve''' (The Bald Soprano), Les Chaises (The Chairs), La Leçon (The Lesson), Rhinoceros Jean Genet – The Maids, The Balcony Samuel Beckett – En attendant Godot (Waiting for Godot), Fin de Partie (Endgame) and other works in French

Nonfiction
 Michel de Montaigne – The Essays Blaise Pascal – Les Pensées René Descartes – Meditations on First Philosophy, Discourse on Method François de La Rochefoucauld – The MaximsJean de la Bruyère - Les Caractères ou les Mœurs de ce siècle
Louis de Rouvroy, duc de Saint-Simon - Mémoires
 Jean-Jacques Rousseau – Discourse on the Arts and Sciences, The Social Contract, Les Confessions (Confessions)
 François-René de Chateaubriand – Genius of Christianity, Memoirs from Beyond Grave Alexis de Tocqueville – Democracy in America Frédéric Bastiat – The Law Jules Michelet – Histoire de France, La Sorcière Henri Bergson – Creative Evolution Albert Camus – The Myth of Sisyphus Jean-Paul Sartre – Existentialism is a Humanism, Being and Nothingness Simone de Beauvoir – The Second Sex Claude Lévi-Strauss – Tristes Tropiques Emil Cioran – A Short History of Decay, The Trouble with Being Born and other works in French
 Paul Ricœur – Freedom and Nature. The Voluntary and the Involuntary Michel Foucault – Discipline and Punish Pierre Bourdieu – La DistinctionLiterary criticism
Nicolas Boileau
Charles-Augustin Sainte-Beuve
Hippolyte Taine
Jacques Lacan
Maurice Blanchot
Paul Bénichou
Roland Barthes
Jean Ricardou
Paul Ricœur
Michel Foucault
Jean-François Lyotard
Jacques Derrida
Julia Kristeva

Poetry

Parnassianism
Romanticism
Symbolism (arts)

See also
 French culture
 French art
 List of French language authors
 List of French language poets
 French science fiction
 Fantastique
 Media of France
 Books in France

 Notes and references 

Further reading
 Brereton, Geoffrey. A short history of French literature (Penguin Books, 1976)
 Burgwinkle, William, Nicholas Hammond, and Emma Wilson, eds. The Cambridge history of French literature (Cambridge University Press, 2011)
 Cobb, Richard, Promenades: a historian's appreciation of modern French literature (Oxford University Press, 1980)
 Harvey, Paul, and Janet E. Heseltine, eds. The Oxford companion to French literature (Clarendon Press, 1961)
 Denis Hollier, ed. A New History of French Literature, Harvard University Press, 1989, 1150 pp.
 France, Peter. The New Oxford Companion to Literature in French, (Oxford University Press, 1995), 926 pp., 
 Kay, Sarah, Terence Cave, Malcolm Bowie. A Short History of French Literature (Oxford University Press, 2006), 356 pp., 
 Reid, Joyce M.H. The concise Oxford dictionary of French literature (Oxford UP, 1976)
  an alternative point of view.
 Sapiro, Gisèle. The French Writers’ War 1940-1953'' (1999; English edition 2014); highly influential study of intellectuals in the French Resistance online review

External links

 French Language & Literature Resources at Yale University
 Littérature francophone virtuelle (ClicNet) online texts
 Athena Textes Français online texts
 The Marandet Collection of French Plays
 ABU online texts
 French Literature at Digital Librarian
 Jean-Michel Maulpoix & Co.: Modern and contemporary French literature site maintained by prominent French poet Jean-Michel Maulpoix